The 1996 South American Rhythmic Gymnastics Championships were held in Santa Cruz de la Sierra, Bolivia.

Medalists

References 

1996 in gymnastics
Rhythmic Gymnastics,1998
International gymnastics competitions hosted by Bolivia
1996 in Bolivian sport